Carlos Moyá was the defending champion, but lost in the quarterfinals to Fabio Fognini.

Fernando Verdasco won in the final 3–6, 6–4, 7–6(7–4), against Igor Andreev.

Seeds
The top four seeds receive a bye into the second round.

Draw

Finals

Top half

Bottom half

External links
 Draw
 Qualifying draw

Singles